The 2012 Quaker State 400 was a NASCAR Sprint Cup Series stock car race that was held on June 30, 2012, at Kentucky Speedway in Sparta, Kentucky. Contested over 267 laps, it was the 17th race of the 2012 NASCAR Sprint Cup Series season. Brad Keselowski won the race, his third of the season. Kasey Kahne finished second and Denny Hamlin was third.

Report

Background

Kentucky Speedway, is one of ten intermediate tracks to hold NASCAR races. The track's turns are banked at 14 degrees, while the front stretch, the location of the finish line, is 8 degrees. The back stretch, opposite of the front, is at only 4 degrees. The racetrack has seats for 107,000 spectators. The defending winner of the event is Kyle Busch, who won it in 2011. The inaugural race was plagued by a massive traffic problem where many of the fans who expected to attend the race were turned away after several hours on Interstate 71. Following the problem, Kentucky Speedway announced that they bought more land for parking and began to work with the state government to improve traffic around the speedway in time for the 2012 race.

Practice and qualifying

Race
The race, the 17th of the 2012 NASCAR Sprint Cup Series season began at 7:48 EDT. The race was televised live in the United States on TNT. Jimmie Johnson started on pole position. The Kentucky Army National Guard and the  Boone County Sheriff's Office presented the flag. The invocation was offered by Pastor John Roberts of Raceway Ministries. Laura Bell Bundy performed the national anthem. The grand marshal was Quaker State Official Steve Reindl.

Results

Qualifying

Race results

Standings after the race

Drivers' Championship standings

Manufacturers' Championship standings

Note: Only the top five positions are included for the driver standings.

References

NASCAR races at Kentucky Speedway
Quaker State 400
Quaker State 400
Quaker State 400